The International Trombone Association is the largest association of trombonists with 4,000 members from 74 countries. Formed in 1972, ITA is a registered non-profit organization.

ITA undertakes numerous activities to further its mission:

 producing the quarterly magazine, ITA Journal
 presenting the annual International Trombone Festival – the world’s largest trombone festival
 organizing the ITA Solo & Ensemble Competitions and Composition Contest Competition
 endowing the ITA Award and Neill Humfeld Award
 publishing trombone sheet music through the ITA Press
 commissioning new trombone music from eminent composers
 managing the Assist an International Member membership sponsorship program
 publishing the ITA website
 promoting the Trombone through the annual International Trombone Week

Presidents

 Tom Everett (1972-1976)
 Buddy Baker (1976-1978)
 Tom Ervin (1978-1980)
 Neill Humfeld (1980-1982)
 Irvin Wagner (1982-1984)
 Robert Gray (1984-1986)
 Steve Anderson (1986-1988)
 John Marcellus (1988-1990)
 Royce Lumpkin (1990-1992)
 Hugo Magliocco (1992-1994)
 Steve Wolfinbarger (1994-1996)
 Heinz Fadle (1996-1998)
 Paul Hunt (1998-2000)
 John Drew (2000-2002)
 Nathaniel Brickens (2002-2004)
 Denis Wick (2004-2006)
 Kenneth Hanlon (2006-2008)
 Don Lucas (2008-2011)
 Jiggs Whigham (2011-2014)
 Joseph Alessi (2014-2017)
 Ben van Dijk (2017-2020)
 Jacques Mauger (2020-2023)

See also 
Columbus State University

References

External links
ITA website
International Trombone Association Records (MC 359), at Columbus State University Archives

 
Brass instrument organizations